Lorenzo Ramos Garcia (born January 29, 1997) is an American soccer player who plays as a midfielder.

Professional career
Ramos joined the Seattle Sounders FC Academy since 2011. On April 11, 2015, he made his professional debut for Seattle Sounders FC 2, a USL affiliate club of Seattle Sounders FC. He came on as a sub in the final minute of S2's 2–1 victory over Portland Timbers 2.

References

External links
 
USSF Development Academy bio

1997 births
Living people
American soccer players
Association football midfielders
Tacoma Defiance players
USL Championship players
Soccer players from Washington (state)
People from Pierce County, Washington